The Benton Hot Spring is a spring in Mono County, California around which grew the town of Benton (also known as Old Benton, and Hot Springs). It is part of the Benton census-designated place for statistical purposes.

The Benton post office opened at the place in 1886. The name honors Senator Thomas Hart Benton, United States senator from Missouri. The town saw its heyday from 1862 to 1889 as a supply center for nearby mines. At the end of the 19th century, the town declined and the name Benton was transferred to Benton Station.

Nearby

References

Reference bibliography 

Unincorporated communities in California
Unincorporated communities in Mono County, California
Hot springs of California
Hot springs of Mono County, California
1862 establishments in California